Miodrag "Micky" Živaljević (Serbin Cyrillic: Mиoдpaг Живaљeвић; born 9 September 1951) is a former Serbian footballer.

Živaljević played professionally in the former Yugoslavia, as well as then-West Germany, France and the United States.

"Micky" (as he was dubbed in the English-speaking world) scored the only goal in the final American Soccer League championship game in 1983, as his Jacksonville Tea Men defeated the Pennsylvania Stoners, 1–0.

References
Weltfussball 

MISL

1951 births
Living people
Sportspeople from Kragujevac
Serbian footballers
Yugoslav footballers
Association football forwards
FK Partizan players
FK Spartak Subotica players
1. FC Nürnberg players
Olympique Lyonnais players
Stade Rennais F.C. players
Anorthosis Famagusta F.C. players
Jacksonville Tea Men players
Kansas City Comets (original MISL) players
Yugoslav First League players
Bundesliga players
Ligue 1 players
Ligue 2 players
Major Indoor Soccer League (1978–1992) players
American Soccer League (1933–1983) players
Yugoslav expatriate footballers
Yugoslav expatriate sportspeople in Germany
Yugoslav expatriate sportspeople in France
Yugoslav expatriate sportspeople in the United States
Expatriate footballers in Germany
Expatriate footballers in France
Expatriate soccer players in the United States